The 4 arrondissements of the Manche department are:
 Arrondissement of Avranches, (subprefecture: Avranches) with 134 communes. The population of the arrondissement was 123,523 in 2013.  
 Arrondissement of Cherbourg, (subprefecture: Cherbourg-en-Cotentin) with 144 communes. The population of the arrondissement was 190,262 in 2013.  
 Arrondissement of Coutances, (subprefecture: Coutances) with 81 communes. The population of the arrondissement was 84,327 in 2013.  
 Arrondissement of Saint-Lô, (prefecture of the Manche department: Saint-Lô) with 87 communes. The population of the arrondissement was 101,807 in 2013.

History

In 1800 the arrondissements of Saint-Lô, Avranches, Coutances, Mortain and Valognes were established. The arrondissement of Cherbourg was created in 1811. The arrondissements of Mortain and Valognes were disbanded in 1926.

The borders of the arrondissements of Manche were modified in January 2017:
 14 communes from the arrondissement of Coutances to the arrondissement of Avranches
 two communes from the arrondissement of Coutances to the arrondissement of Cherbourg
 one commune from the arrondissement of Coutances to the arrondissement of Saint-Lô
 two communes from the arrondissement of Saint-Lô to the arrondissement of Coutances

References

Manche